Crystal Heights is a neighborhood in the north end of the Dartmouth area in Nova Scotia's Halifax Regional Municipality.

Part of the larger neighbourhood of Albro Lake, Crystal Heights is a development comprising high-density apartment buildings. It is adjacent to Highfield Park, a similar development dating to the 1970s.

Communities in Halifax, Nova Scotia
Dartmouth, Nova Scotia